Selånger FK is a Swedish football club located in Selånger in Västernorrland County. It is a part of the alliance club Selånger SK. Their most acclaimed player is Vilma Abrahamsson.

Background
Selånger Fotbollklubb was founded in 1921 as Selånger Sportklubb (Selånger SK). Selånger SK had departments for a number of sports, but in 1991 it was split up in a number of clubs which however still cooperate in an alliance and share the same logo. Apart from Selånger FK, these are Selånger SK Bandy and Selånger SOK.

The football club are now one of the biggest clubs in Västernorrland with 650 members. They run 23 league teams and also provide a football school for children of 5–7 years of age.

Since their foundation Selånger FK has participated mainly in the middle and lower divisions of the Swedish football league system.  The club currently plays in Division 1 Norrla which is the third tier of Swedish football. They play their home matches at Norrporten Arena in Sundsvall. The club manages the facility themselves which at the moment has seven grass pitches and a building with changing rooms and a cafeteria.

Selånger FK are affiliated to the Medelpads Fotbollförbund.

Season to season

Attendances

In recent seasons Selånger FK have had the following average attendances:

The attendance record for Selånger FK was 350 spectators at the local derby match against Sund IF in 2011 (Division 3 Södra Norrland).

Combined Clubs
  Selangor FA

Footnotes

External links
 Selånger FK – Official website
 Selånger FK – Football website
 Selånger FK Facebook
 Selånger SK Supporters of the world Facebook

Sport in Sundsvall
Football clubs in Västernorrland County
Association football clubs established in 1921
1921 establishments in Sweden